The Arbuckle Group is a geologic group in Oklahoma. It preserves fossils dating back to the Ordovician period.

See also

 Arbuckle Mountains
 List of fossiliferous stratigraphic units in Oklahoma
 Paleontology in Oklahoma
 Oklahoma earthquake swarms (2009–present)

References
 

Ordovician System of North America
Geologic groups of Oklahoma